Turó del Castell is a mountain of the Guilleries Massif, Catalonia, Spain. It has an elevation of 851.1 metres above sea level. The Susqueda reservoir lies off the southern slopes of the mountain. The high plateau lying ENE of the mountain is known as Pla del Castell. A rocky outcrop known as Puig de la Força (739 m) rises WSW of the summit.

References

Mountains of Catalonia